Bradford Barons  were a motorcycle speedway team based at Odsal Stadium in Odsal, Bradford, from 1974 to 1975.

History
1974 saw yet another name change with Bradford Barons replacing Bradford Northern as Alan Knapkin began his first full season in charge. He also sought and obtained special dispensation from the sports governing body to resume riding, but after a number of good results it was suddenly withdrawn on 16 June. On 17 July it was announced that the promoting rights had been sold again, this time to Shipley newsagent and long time Bradford speedway fan Jim Streets. At the end of the season the team once again finished in 7th position.

In 1975 Division Two was renamed the New National League. The crowd levels continued to fall, especially following the introduction of stock cars and the resulting damage to the track. Even the return of Alan Knapkin to the team on 25 June didn't greatly improve the situation as the team finished in 11th position. It was therefore of little surprise that shortly after the Barons had defeated Stoke and Mildenhall in a double header on 1 October it was announced that speedway would not take place at Odsal in 1976. It would be another ten years before speedway came back to Bradford. 

However, Jim Streets did not give up without a fight and attempted unsuccessfully to introduce speedway at the former home of Bradford (Park Avenue) Football Club. Noise tests and team line up plans were made but eventually he was forced to withdraw.

Season summary

Notable riders
Alan Knapkin
Tony Featherstone
Colin Meredith
Mick Fairbairn
Steve Wilcock
Mike Fielding
Tony Boyle
Dave Baugh

See also
 Odsal Boomerangs
 Bradford Tudors
 Bradford Panthers
 Bradford Northern (speedway)
 Bradford Dukes

References

Sport in Bradford
Defunct British speedway teams